The 1971 RAC British Saloon Car Championship was the 14th season of the championship. Bill McGovern won his second title, driving a Sunbeam Imp.

Calendar & Winners
All races were held in the United Kingdom. Overall winners in bold.

Championship results

References

British Touring Car Championship seasons
Saloon